Beautiful Duckling is a 1965 Taiwanese film directed by Li Hsing. It tells the story of a duck man Lin Tsai-tien (Ko Hsiang-ting) and his adopted daughter Hsiao-yue. Hsiao-yue (Tang Pao-yun) knows nothing about her real descent, which Lin has designedly disguised. Her natural brother Chao-fu (Ou Wei) is a Taiwanese opera actor, he keeps asking Lin for money. He brings Hsiao-yue to the theatrical troupe to follow himself, where Hsiao-yue learns about her natural parents. Lin has to sell all his ducks, entrust Hsiao-yue to Chao-fu, and gives him money to let him start his own business. At the end of the film, Lin's son comes back, and Chao-fu repents his behavior and returns the money to Lin.

The film is one of the representative works of Healthy Documentary Film in Taiwan, the traditional Chinese ethics. It received three Golden Horse Awards including wins for Best Picture, Best Director and Best Cinematography.

References

External links

1965 films
Taiwanese drama films
Films set in Taiwan
Films whose director won the Best Director Golden Horse Award
Films with screenplays by Chang Yung-hsiang
Films directed by Li Hsing
Central Motion Picture Corporation films